Lagocheirus procerus is a species of longhorn beetles of the subfamily Lamiinae. It was described by Casey in 1913, and is known from Baja California, Mexico.

References

Beetles described in 1913
Endemic fauna of California
Lagocheirus
Fauna without expected TNC conservation status